Remington USD 206 is a public unified school district headquartered in Whitewater, Kansas, United States.  Depending on the historic use, it may also have the word "Whitewater" either before or after "Remington".  The district includes the communities of Whitewater, Potwin, Brainerd, Elbing, Furley, and nearby rural areas in Butler, Harvey, Sedgwick counties.

History
In 1961, Whitewater, Potwin, Brainerd, Elbing, Furley, Countryside, and Golden Gate schools merged to form a joint rural high school. Heated opposition between Whitewater and Potwin occurred during the discussion for the location of the new high school.  Rural voters pushed for a centralized location in neither town.  A public vote was taken to determine if the school should be built halfway between Whitewater and Potwin, near Brainerd, which passed 745 "yes" to 155 "no".  A contest was held to find a unique name for the new high school, which was chosen to honor the famous American Old West artist Frederic Remington who lived about 4 miles north near Plum Grove in the 1880s.

Schools
The school district operates the following schools:
 Frederic Remington High School at 8850 NW Meadowlark Road, north of Brainerd.
 Remington Middle School at 316 E Topeka Street in Whitewater.
 Remington Elementary School at 200 E Ellis Avenue in Potwin.

See also
 List of high schools in Kansas
 List of unified school districts in Kansas
 Kansas State Department of Education
 Kansas State High School Activities Association

References

Further reading

 Plum Grove, Brainerd, Whitewater, and Potwin from 1870 to 1900; Roland H. Ensz; Emporia State University; 134 pages; 1970.
 History of Butler County, Kansas; Vol P Mooney; Standard Publishing; 869 pages; 1916. Plum Grove on pages 184 to 191.

External links
 

School districts in Kansas
Education in Butler County, Kansas
1961 establishments in Kansas
School districts established in 1961